Duchess Landing is a census-designated place (CDP) in McIntosh County, Oklahoma, United States. The population was 95 at the 2000 census.

Geography
Duchess Landing is located at  (35.406634, -95.408596).

Demographics

As of the census of 2000, there were 95 people, 35 households, and 26 families residing in the CDP. The population density was 16.0 people per square mile (6.2/km2). There were 40 housing units at an average density of 6.7/sq mi (2.6/km2). The racial makeup of the CDP was 61.05% White, 36.84% Native American, and 2.11% from two or more races.

There were 35 households, out of which 37.1% had children under the age of 18 living with them, 74.3% were married couples living together, 2.9% had a female householder with no husband present, and 22.9% were non-families. 22.9% of all households were made up of individuals, and 8.6% had someone living alone who was 65 years of age or older. The average household size was 2.71 and the average family size was 3.11.

In the CDP, the population was spread out, with 28.4% under the age of 18, 5.3% from 18 to 24, 27.4% from 25 to 44, 29.5% from 45 to 64, and 9.5% who were 65 years of age or older. The median age was 36 years. For every 100 females, there were 90.0 males. For every 100 females age 18 and over, there were 83.8 males.

The median income for a household in the CDP was $13,750, and the median income for a family was $46,250. Males had a median income of $13,750 versus $30,156 for females. The per capita income for the CDP was $13,075. There were no families and 15.0% of the population living below the poverty line, including no under eighteens and none of those over 64.

References

Census-designated places in McIntosh County, Oklahoma
Census-designated places in Oklahoma